Eric John Hopkins Dixon (1915-1941) was an English cricketer who played for Oxford University and Northamptonshire between 1936 and 1939. He received a posthumous mention in despatches. He appeared in 49 first-class cricket matches as a right-handed batsman who scored 2,356 runs with a highest score of 123, one of two centuries.

Notes

1915 births
1941 deaths
English cricketers
Northamptonshire cricketers
Oxford University cricketers
People from Horbury
Cricketers from Yorkshire
Oxford and Cambridge Universities cricketers
People educated at St Edward's School, Oxford
Alumni of Christ Church, Oxford
Fleet Air Arm aviators
Royal Navy personnel killed in World War II
Fleet Air Arm personnel of World War II
Royal Naval Volunteer Reserve personnel of World War II
Victims of aviation accidents or incidents in 1941